The 1958 NCAA University Division Cross Country Championships were the 20th annual cross country meet to determine the team and individual national champions of men's collegiate cross country running in the United States. It was the first championship held exclusively for University Division (future Division I) teams; all small college teams were shifted to the established NCAA Men's College Division Cross Country Championship (later re-designated as Division II). 

Held on November 24, 1958, the meet was hosted by Michigan State University at the Forest Akers East Golf Course in East Lansing, Michigan. The distance for the race was 4 miles (6.4 kilometers). 

Following the creation of the NCAA"s multi-division structure this year, only NCAA University Division teams, and their respective runners, were eligible. In total, 14 teams and 106 individual runners contested this championship.

The team national championship was won by the Michigan State Spartans, their seventh. The individual championship was won by Crawford Kennedy, also from Michigan State, with a time of 20:07.1.

Men's title
Distance: 4 miles (6.4 kilometers)

Team Result

See also
NCAA Men's College Division Cross Country Championship

References
 

NCAA Cross Country Championships
NCAA University Division Cross Country Championships
NCAA University Division Cross Country Championships
Sports competitions in East Lansing, Michigan
Track and field in Michigan
NCAA University Division Cross Country Championships
Michigan State University